The 1964 Danish 2nd Division (Danish: Danmarksturneringens 2. division 1964) was the twenty-ninth season of the Danish second-tier association football division since the establishment of Danmarksturneringen's nation-wide league structure in 1927. Governed by the Danish FA, the season was launched on 29 March 1964, with the match between Ikast FS and Vanløse IF, and the last round of matches concluded in November 1964. Aalborg BK and Køge BK entered as relegated teams from last season's top-flight, while Hvidovre IF and Næstved IF entered as promoted teams from the 1963 Danish 3rd Division. Fixtures for the 1964 season were announced in February 1964.

Hvidovre IF won the league, securing their third promotion in a row after having entered second-tier league for the first time in the club's history, with Aalborg BK becoming the runners-up and returning immediately to the top-flight in the 1965 Danish 1st Division. At the end of the season, the two clubs with the fewest points in the final league standings, Vanløse IF and Randers SK Freja, were relegated to the 1965 Danish 3rd Division. Helge Jørgensen of Odense KFUM became the league's top scorer, netting a total of 24 goals.

Summary
The 1964 season was inaugurated on 29 March with a single Easter Sunday match between Ikast FS, that finished the 1963 Danish 2nd Division season in ninth place, and Vanløse IF, that finished in tenth place last season, at Ikast Stadium in front of a crowd of 1,200 spectators. Ikast FS' centerforward Jørgen Nielsen scored the first goal of the season in the 11th minute after a pass from Kristian Mosegaard and scored additional two goals after 34 and 80 minutes of play, hence also completing the first hat-trick of the season. The remaining fixture for the first matchday was held on 30 March 1964.

On 26 April 1964, the game between Hvidovre IF and Odense KFUM became the first live television transmission by Danmarks Radio from a domestic competitive match  in the Danmarksturneringen i fodbold. The league match, played at Hvidovre Stadium with an attendance of 4,850 spectators, was won 2-1 by the Copenhagen suburban-based club. Over 1 million television viewers nationwide tuned to watch the match that was shown in its full length at 18:00 CET until approx. 19:45 CET.

Teams

Twelve teams competed in the league – eight teams from the previous season, two teams relegated from the top tier and two teams promoted from the third tier. The promoted teams were Hvidovre IF, who entered the second-tier league for the first time in the club's history, and Næstved IF, returning after a three-year absence. They replaced Skovshoved IF and Hellerup IK, ending their second-tier spells of two and three years respectively. The relegated teams were Aalborg BK, returning after one season, and Køge BK, returning after a three-year absence, replacing BK Frem and B.93, who returned to the top-flight division, ending their spells in the second-tier of three and four years respectively.

Stadiums and locations

Personnel

Coaching changes

League table
Every team played two games against the other teams, at home and away, totaling 22 games each. Teams received two points for a win and one point for a draw. If two or more teams were tied on points, places were determined by goal average. The team with the most points were crowned winners of the league. The winners and the runners-up were promoted to the 1965 Danish 1st Division, while the two teams with the fewest points would be relegated to the 1965 Danish 3rd Division.

Results

Statistics

Scoring

Top scorers

Hat-tricks

Clean sheets

References

1963–64 in European second tier association football leagues
1964–65 in European second tier association football leagues
1963–64 in Danish football
1964–65 in Danish football